Celia S. Friedman (born January 12, 1957) is an American speculative fiction author who often writes as "C. S. Friedman."

As of 2022, she has published fourteen novels, numerous short stories—several of which were included in her 2021 collection, The Dreaming Kind, and a sourcebook for White Wolf's Vampire: The Masquerade role-playing game.

Originally a costume designer, Friedman began her publishing career in 1986. She quit costuming in 1996 to write full-time.

Friedman was nominated for the John W. Campbell award for Best New Writer in 1988 (now called the Astounding Award, and her novel This Alien Shore was a New York Times Notable Book of the Year in 1998. In 2006, she was the author guest of honor at ICON, the oldest and largest science fiction convention in Iowa.

In August 2022, Deadline reported that Bohemia Group, a global management firm, was shopping a potential television series based on The Coldfire Trilogy, which was a finalist for NPR's Science Fiction and Fantasy Vote in 2011.

Works

References

External links
 
The Forest of the Hunter: The Official C.S. Friedman fansite
Bibliography on SciFan
Interview at Neth Space
CS Friedman-based MUD
 
 

1957 births
Living people
20th-century American novelists
21st-century American novelists
American fantasy writers
American science fiction writers
American women short story writers
American women novelists
Dark fantasy writers
Writers from New York City
Women science fiction and fantasy writers
20th-century American women writers
21st-century American women writers
20th-century American short story writers
21st-century American short story writers
Novelists from New York (state)